Maryam d'Abo (born 27 December 1960) is a British actress, best known as Bond girl Kara Milovy in the 1987 James Bond film The Living Daylights.

Early life
Born in London to Georgian mother Nino Kvinitadze, daughter of General Giorgi Kvinitadze, and Anglo-Dutch father Peter Claude Holland d'Abo, of a landed gentry family of West Wratting, Cambridgeshire. Maryam d'Abo was raised in Paris and Geneva.

D’Abo was drawing from the age of eight, but by 13 wanted to become an actress; she joined an amateur theatre company while at school in Geneva. She decided to do a foundation course at the London College of Printing at 18, but abandoned those studies in order to go to drama school at Drama Centre London. She left after one term in order to make her film debut.

Career
D'Abo made her screen debut in the low-budget science fiction horror film Xtro (1982), playing Analise Mercier, a French au pair, who becomes a human incubator for an alien. She appeared in the film Until September (1984) and had small roles in television mini-series based on Sidney Sheldon's novels Master of the Game (1984) and If Tomorrow Comes.  She also appeared in Oscar winner Taylor Hackford's film White Nights (1985) and in an uncredited role as a woman pouring champagne to Klaus Maria Brandauer at a hunting party in the Oscar winning Out of Africa (1985), directed by Oscar winner Sydney Pollack.  Other credits include Arthur the King (1985).

She worked on the French stage in Lyon playing Varinia in Spartacus directed by Jacques Weber in 1981, played Roxane in Cyrano de Bergerac at the Grenier de Toulouse in 1982, then worked in a 1987 French TV movie, Les Idiots (The Idiots), written by Gérard Brach, with Jean Carmet and Jean-Pierre Marielle.

D'Abo had a starring role in The Living Daylights (1987) as Kara Milovy, the sweet and vulnerable Czechoslovakian cellist and would-be sniper who falls for James Bond. As a tie-in with the film, she also appeared in a Bond-themed Playboy cover and multi-page pictorial in the September 1987 issue, but later said in an interview with People magazine that "I wouldn't do those pictures now... I've learned a lot since then".

On television, d'Abo played Ta'Ra, an alien medical officer in the science fiction miniseries Something Is Out There (1988), which was followed by a six-episode NBC mini-series of the same name, and she played Anne Summerton in the TV adaptation of Jeffrey Archer's novel Not a Penny More, Not a Penny Less (1990) directed by Clive Donner.

D'Abo had a supporting role as a pretentious stained-glass artist in the low-budget British comedy Leon the Pig Farmer (1992). She appeared in the 1994 film The Browning Version and starred in Timelock (1996).

D'Abo has had roles in various low-budget, straight-to-video action, horror and fantasy films such as Tomcat: Dangerous Desires (1992), as well as guest roles on television shows Tales from the Crypt (1993), Red Shoe Diaries (1992) and Murder, She Wrote (1992).

She reunited with her James Bond director John Glen for a guest-starring role on the television series Space Precinct and for the feature film The Point Men (2001). Glen later claimed that the reason he cast her in three different projects was because she was one of his favourite actresses. She played the mother of Lara (played by Keira Knightley) in the television miniseries version of Doctor Zhivago (2002), and she was Queen Hecuba in the Emmy-nominated miniseries Helen of Troy (2003). She had a small role in the French film L'Enfer (Hell, 2005), directed by Danis Tanovic whose stars included fellow Bond Girl Carole Bouquet.

D'Abo and John Cork wrote the book Bond Girls Are Forever, published in 2002, which is a tribute to the women who have played the role of a Bond girl. It was inspired by the documentary Bond Girls Are Forever, which she produced with Planetgrande, featuring d'Abo and other Bond girls, including Ursula Andress. The documentary appeared on the American AMC network in 2002, timed to coincide with the theatrical release of Die Another Day. It was later included as a gift with the purchase of Die Another Day on DVD by some retailers. In 2006, a new version of the documentary, updated to include interviews with cast from Casino Royale (2006) was again aired on the AMC network and later released as a bonus feature on the March 2007 Blu-ray disc and DVD release of Casino Royale.

In 2004 she wrote and, with Cabin Creek Films, co-produced the documentary film Bearing Witness, about five female war reporters featuring Marie Colvin and Janine di Giovanni, which Barbara Kopple and Marijana Wotton directed for A&E. The feature documentary premiered at the Tribeca Film Festival.

In 2007, she had surgery for a brain haemorrhage; after recovering, she was inspired to meet other people who had similar experiences. She worked on and produced a 2009 documentary on the topic.

In 2009, she had a supporting role in the British period fantasy-thriller Dorian Gray. She appeared in the 2014 Indian film Tigers directed by Danis Tanovic.

D'Abo is signed to Models 1. In 2015, she modelled for fashion retailer JD Williams' AW 15 collection that includes clothing for women in their 50s.

Personal life
D'Abo is a cousin of Mike d'Abo, a singer and member of 1960s group Manfred Mann. This makes her first cousin once removed of actress Olivia d'Abo. Maryam and Olivia once lived in Los Angeles, buying a house together in 1988, after Olivia turned 19.

D'Abo is the granddaughter (on her mother's side) of the anti-communist Georgian general Giorgi Kvinitadze.

In November 2003, D'Abo married Hugh Hudson, the Oscar-nominated British director of Chariots of Fire (1981). They remained married until his death on 10 February 2023.

In 2007, D'Abo had surgery for a brain haemorrhage from which she recovered.

Filmography

References

External links
 
 Audio interview at BBC Wiltshire

1960 births
Living people
Alumni of the Drama Centre London
British film actresses
English television actresses
British people of Georgian descent
British people of Dutch descent
Maryam
Actresses from London
Actors from Geneva
Actresses from Paris
People from Hammersmith
20th-century British actresses
21st-century British actresses